Surrey Storm is an English netball team based at the University of Surrey. Their senior team plays in the Netball Superleague. Between 2001 and 2005 they played in the Super Cup as London Hurricanes. After forming a partnership with Brunel University London, they became the Brunel Hurricanes. In 2005–06 they were founder members of the new Netball Superleague. Before the 2009–10 Netball Superleague season, they ended their partnership with Brunel University, relocated to the University of Surrey and became Surrey Storm. As Surrey Storm they were Superleague champions in 2015 and 2016.

History

London Hurricanes
Between 2001 and 2005, London Hurricanes, together with five other franchises – Northern Flames, London Tornadoes, Team Bath Force, University of Birmingham Blaze and Northern Thunder – competed in the Super Cup. Players from the London Hurricanes Super Cup era included Abby Teare, Louisa Brownfield, Chioma Ezeogu, Sonia Mkoloma   and Ama Agbeze.

Brunel Hurricanes
By 2005 London Hurricanes had formed a partnership with Brunel University London. They subsequently became known as the Brunel Hurricanes. In 2005 Brunel Hurricanes were named as the Greater London/South East England franchise in the new Netball Superleague. Together with Celtic Dragons, Leeds Carnegie, Galleria Mavericks, Team Bath, Loughborough Lightning, Northern Thunder and Team Northumbria, Brunel Hurricanes were founder members of the league. Players from the Brunel Hurricanes era included Chioma Ezeogu and Sonia Mkoloma. Kadeen Corbin also played for Brunel Hurricanes at youth level.

Surrey Storm
As the 2009–10 Netball Superleague season approached, Brunel Hurricanes ended their partnership with Brunel University London, relocated to the University of Surrey and became Surrey Storm. In September 2009, Sonia Mkoloma and Geva Mentor became the first two players to sign for the franchise under the Surrey Storm name. 
In October 2009 Tamsin Greenway also signed for Surrey Storm. The arrival of Greenway saw the beginning of the most successful era in the history of the franchise. As team captain, player/coach and director of netball, Greenway played a pivotal part in this success. Between 2011 and 2016 Surrey Storm played in five out of the six Netball Superleague grand finals. After finishing as runners up in the first three, Surrey Storm won their first Netball Superleague title in 2015 and then retained the title in 2016.

Senior finals

Super Cup

Netball Superleague Grand Finals
Between 2011 and 2016 Surrey Storm played in five out of the six Netball Superleague grand finals. After finishing as runners up in the first three, Surrey Storm won their first Netball Superleague title in 2015 and then retained the title in 2016.

Home venues
Brunel Hurricanes played their home games at both Brunel University London and the Guildford Spectrum. The latter was their regular home during the 2007–08 and 2008–09 seasons. Surrey Storm also played at the Guildford Spectrum during 2009–10 before subsequently moving to the Surrey Sports Park at the University of Surrey. Surrey Storm have also played home Superleague games at the Copper Box Arena.

Notable players

2023 squad

Internationals

 Sharni Layton

 Sigrid Burger
 Bongiwe Msomi
 Shadine van der Merwe

 Niamh Cooper

Coaches

Head coaches

Directors of netball

Honours
Netball Superleague
Winners: 2015, 2016: 2
Runners up: 2011, 2012, 2014: 3
Super Cup
Runners up: 2003: 1

See also
 2015 Surrey Storm season
 2016 Surrey Storm season

References

External links
 Surrey Storm on Facebook
  Surrey Storm on Twitter

 
Netball Superleague teams
Netball teams in England
Storm
2001 establishments in England
Sports clubs established in 2001
Sport in Guildford